Mai Narva (born October 22, 1999) is an Estonian chess player holding the titles of International Master and Woman Grandmaster.

Biography
Mai Narva was born in a chess player's family. She is Estonian chess master Boris Rõtov's and Lady International Correspondence Chess Grandmaster Merike Rõtova's granddaughter. Her father, Jaan Narva, is FIDE master, her mother is Regina Narva and her sister Triin Narva.

Mai Narva won the Estonian Women's Chess Championship four times: 2014, 2016 (after play-off), 2017 and 2020. She also won silver medal in 2013 Estonian Women's Chess Championship and shared second place in 2015 Estonian Open Chess Championship. In 2014 Mai Narva won 24th European Youth Chess Championship U16 (girls) in Batumi. In 2015, she was a member of Estonian U18 national team that won the 15th European U18 Team Chess Championship (girls) in Karpacz.

Mai Narva played for Estonia in Chess Olympiads:
 In 2014, at first board in the 41st Chess Olympiad (women) in Tromsø (+6 −4 =1);
 In 2016, at first board in the 42nd Chess Olympiad (women) in Baku (+3 -5 =2);
 In 2018, at first board in the 43rd Chess Olympiad (women) in Batumi (+6, =3, -1).

She studied at Gustav Adolf Grammar School. She is a member of the UMBC chess team.

References

External links
 
 
 

1999 births
Living people
Sportspeople from Tallinn
Estonian female chess players
Chess Woman International Masters
Estonian people of Russian descent